Sung Ji-ru (born October 16, 1968) is a South Korean actor.

Filmography

Film

Television series

Awards and nominations

References

External links 
 
 
 

1968 births
Living people
People from Gongju
20th-century South Korean male actors
21st-century South Korean male actors
South Korean male film actors
South Korean male television actors